Raleigh Hotel was a historic high-rise office and then hotel building located in Washington, D.C., United States, on 12th Street, N.W., and Pennsylvania Avenue, in the downtown neighborhood.

History
The site, on the northeast corner of 12th Street N.W., and Pennsylvania Avenue, was originally occupied by the Fountain Inn, erected in 1815 after the burning of Washington. This structure was razed and in 1847 the four-story Fuller Hotel opened. Renamed the Kirkwood House, it was the residence of Vice President Andrew Johnson; he took the oath of office of the president of the United States there in April 1865 after the assassination of President Abraham Lincoln.

Kirkwood House was razed in 1875 and replaced with the Shepherd Centennial Building, a seven-story office building in the Second Empire style (it opened in 1876). The upper floors were rented by the Pension Office from 1876 to 1885, as they apparently had to use multiple private office buildings until their new building, the Pension Bureau building was ready. 
The ground floor on the Pennsylvania Avenue side was rented by the Palais Royal department store from 1877 to 1893.

The Shepherd Centennial Building was converted into a hotel in 1893 by architect Leon E. Dessez and renamed the Raleigh Hotel. The Raleigh Hotel was razed in 1911 and rebuilt by architect Henry Janeway Hardenbergh as a 13-story Beaux Arts hotel with a rusticated brick, white limestone, and terra cotta exterior. 
In 1936, there was a major interior renovation. Curt Schliffeler managed the hotel from 1936 to 1954.
In 1964, the Raleigh was demolished.

The site is now known as 1111 Pennsylvania Avenue.

See also
List of tallest buildings in Washington, D.C.

References

External links

"Lost Washington: The Raleigh Hotel", Greater Greater Washington, Kent Boese, July 17, 2009
"The Magnificent Raleigh Hotel", Streets of Washington'', John DeFerrari, March 25, 2010

Demolished buildings and structures in Washington, D.C.
Skyscraper hotels in Washington, D.C.
Buildings and structures demolished in 1964
Demolished hotels in the United States
1893 establishments in Washington, D.C.
1960s disestablishments in Washington, D.C.